Merja Lahtinen (born Merja Kuusisto, 1968) is a Finnish former cross-country skier who competed from 1992 to 1998. Competing at the 1994 Winter Olympics in Lillehammer, she had her best finish of fourth in the 4 × 5 km relay and her best individual finish of 15th in the 30 km event.

Lahtinen's best finish at the FIS Nordic World Ski Championships was tenth in the 15 km event at Thunder Bay, Ontario in 1995. Her best world Cup finish was 11th twice, both in Finland (1992, 1995).

Lahtinen's best individual career finish was second twice in 5 km FIS races in Finland (1994, 1997).

Cross-country skiing results
All results are sourced from the International Ski Federation (FIS).

Olympic Games

World Championships

World Cup

Season standings

Team podiums

 2 podiums

References

External links

Women's 4 x 5 km cross-country relay Olympic results: 1976-2002 

1968 births
Living people
Cross-country skiers at the 1994 Winter Olympics
Finnish female cross-country skiers
People from Laihia
Sportspeople from Ostrobothnia (region)
20th-century Finnish women